Hache is a river of Lower Saxony, Germany. It flows into the Ochtum near Leeste.

See also
List of rivers of Lower Saxony

References

Rivers of Lower Saxony
Rivers of Germany